Kaarel Robert Pusta (also Karl Robert Pusta; 1 March 1883, Narva – 4 May 1964, Madrid) was an Estonian politician and a former Minister of Foreign Affairs of Estonia.

Honours 
 1925: Grand Cordon Order of Leopold
1925: Order of the Three Stars, 1st Class

References

1883 births
1964 deaths
Politicians from Narva
People from Yamburgsky Uyezd
Government ministers of Estonia
Envoys of Estonia
Ministers of Foreign Affairs of Estonia
Estonian emigrants to the United States
Estonian emigrants to Spain
Estonian World War II refugees
20th-century Estonian politicians
Order of Leopold (Belgium)